Praproče may refer to several places in Slovenia: 

Praproče, Dobrova–Polhov Gradec, a settlement in the Municipality of Dobrova–Polhov Gradec
Praproče, Koper, a settlement in the Municipality of Koper
Praproče, Ribnica, a settlement in the Municipality of Ribnica
Praproče, Semič, a settlement in the Municipality of Semič
Praproče pri Grosupljem, a settlement in the Municipality of Grosuplje
Praproče pri Temenici, a settlement in the Municipality of Ivančna Gorica
Praproče v Tuhinju, a settlement in the Municipality of Kamnik
Praproše, a settlement in the Municipality of Radovljica, sometimes known as Praproče